Pat or Patricia Farrell may refer to:
 Pat Farrell, chief executive of the Irish Banking Federation and former Irish senator
 Pat Farrell, Franciscan nun, the head of the Leadership Conference of Women Religious in the USA
 Patricia Farrell (darts player), in WDF Asia-Pacific Cup

See also
 Patrick Farrell (disambiguation)